The Northern Ireland Billiards and Snooker Association, or NIBSA, is the national governing body for Snooker and Billiards in Northern Ireland, recognised by the Sports Council for Northern Ireland, Sport NI. The aims of the association are to develop and promote the sport at grass roots level in Northern Ireland through events and competitions, while providing a platform for talented snooker players to compete in national and international events.

NIBSA are affiliated to the European Billiards and Snooker Association (EBSA). As the National Governing body for cue sports in Northern Ireland, NIBSA are also affiliated to the World Snooker Federation.

Mark Allen received Lottery Funding via NIBSA while an amateur player, facilitating his growth and development in the sport.

References

External links
 European Billiards and Snooker Association
 World Snooker Tour

Snooker
Snooker governing bodies